Handan Biroğlu (born March 1, 1981) is a Turkish female para-archer competing in the women's compound bow event. She represents her country at the 2016 Paralympics.

Early life
Handan Biroğlu was born in Erzincan, Turkey on March 1, 1981. She resides in Ankara.  In 2001, she was paralyzed due to a spinal cord injury she sustained in a bus accident, and has since required the use of a wheelchair.

Biroğlu became pregnant about a year after her accident. During her pregnancy, physicians advised her to abort due to her paraplegia and to her fetus' brain defect. However, she decided to give birth, risking her own life. Two years after her accident, she became the mother of a daughter. Six years after her daughter's birth, she and her husband separated. Biroğlu raised her daughter Nurdan alone in her father's home.
 
Biroğlu says "The existence of my daughter gave me zest for my life", and adds that she "chose archery to be a powerful role model for my daughter."

Sporting career
In late 2013, Biroğlu began to practise archery in the compound bow event by training under the instruction of coach Macide Erdener at the archery field in Lozan Park of Çankaya, Ankara. She competed for the archery-specialized sports club Ankara Okçuluk İhtisas SK, before she transferred to Ankara Bozoklar SK. She has been coached by Okyay Tunç Küçükkayalar since 2014.

In 2015, she was named Disabled Sportsperson of the Year in Turkey. In March 2014, a year after taking up archery, Biroğlu qualified to join the training camp of the Turkish national team after ranking fourth at the Turkish Indoor Archery Para Championships.

She competed internationally for the first time in the 2014 European Para Archery Championships held in Nottwil, Switzerland. She placed eighth in the Compound Bow Open Women event, and won the bronze medal in the Compound Women Open Team event with her teammates Burcu Dağ and Gülbin Su after defeating Italy in the finals. At the 2015 World Archery Para Championships held in Donaueschingen, Germany, Biroğlu placed fifth in the Compound Women Open event after defeating Ireland's Kerrie-Louise Leonard, securing a spot in the 2016 Rio Paralympics. She took the silver medal in the Compound Women Open event at the 2016 European Para Archery Championships in Saint-Jean-de-Monts, France after being beaten by Russia's Tatiana Andrievskaia in the final.

Biroğlu was the runner-up at the 2016 Turkish Archery Para Championships held in Kemer, Antalya.

Honors
Individual
Disabled Sportsperson of the Year in Turkey 2015.

See also
Turkish women in sports

References

External links
 

1981 births
People from Erzincan
Turkish female archers
Paralympic archers of Turkey
People with paraplegia
Wheelchair category Paralympic competitors
Archers at the 2016 Summer Paralympics
Living people
21st-century Turkish sportswomen